The following is a list of notable proteins that are produced from recombinant DNA, using biomolecular engineering. In many cases, recombinant human proteins have replaced the original animal-derived version used in medicine. The prefix "rh" for "recombinant human" appears less and less in the literature. A much larger number of recombinant proteins is used in the research laboratory. These include both commercially available proteins (for example most of the enzymes used in the molecular biology laboratory), and those that are generated in the course specific research projects.

Human recombinants that largely replaced animal or harvested from human types

Medicinal applications
 Human growth hormone (rHGH): Humatrope from Lilly and Serostim from Serono replaced cadaver harvested human growth hormone
 human insulin (BHI): Humulin from Lilly and Novolin from Novo Nordisk among others largely replaced bovine and porcine insulin for human therapy.  Some prefer to continue using the animal-sourced preparations, as there is some evidence that synthetic insulin varieties are more likely to induce hypoglycemia unawareness. Remaining manufacturers of highly purified animal-sourced insulin include the U.K.'s Wockhardt Ltd. (headquartered in India), Argentina's Laboratorios Beta S.A., and China's Wanbang Biopharma Co.
 Follicle-stimulating hormone (FSH) as a recombinant gonadotropin preparation replaced Serono's Pergonal which was previously isolated from post-menopausal female urine
 Factor VIII: Kogenate from Bayer replaced blood harvested factor VIII

Research applications
 Ribosomal proteins: For the studies of individual ribosomal proteins, the use of proteins that are produced and purified from recombinant sources has largely replaced those that are obtained through isolation. However, isolation is still required for the studies of the whole ribosome.
 Lysosomal proteins: Lysosomal proteins are difficult to produce recombinantly due to the number and type of post-translational modifications that they have (e.g. glycosylation). As a result, recombinant lysosomal proteins are usually produced in mammalian cells. Plant cell culture was used to produce FDA-approved glycosylated lysosomal protein-drug, and additional drug candidates. Recent studies have shown that it may be possible to produce recombinant lysosomal proteins with microorganisms such as Escherichia coli and Saccharomyces cerevisiae. Recombinant lysosomal proteins are used for both research and medical applications, such as enzyme replacement therapy.

Human recombinants with recombination as only source

Medicinal applications
 Erythropoietin (EPO): Epogen from Amgen
 Granulocyte colony-stimulating factor (G-CSF): filgrastim sold as Neupogen from Amgen; pegfilgrastim sold as Neulasta
  alpha-galactosidase A: Fabrazyme by Genzyme
 alpha-L-iduronidase: (rhIDU; laronidase) Aldurazyme by BioMarin Pharmaceutical and Genzyme
 N-acetylgalactosamine-4-sulfatase (rhASB; galsulfase):  Naglazyme by BioMarin Pharmaceutical
 Dornase alfa, a DNase sold under the trade name Pulmozyme by Genentech
 Tissue plasminogen activator (TPA) Activase by Genentech
 Glucocerebrosidase: Ceredase by Genzyme
 Interferon (IF) Interferon-beta-1a: Avonex from Biogen Idec; Rebif from Serono; Interferon beta-1b as Betaseron from Schering. It is being investigated for the treatments of diseases including Guillain-Barré syndrome and multiple sclerosis.
 Insulin-like growth factor 1 (IGF-1)
 Rasburicase, a Urate Oxidase analog sold as Elitek from Sanofi

Animal recombinants

Medicinal applications
 Bovine somatotropin (bST)
 Porcine somatotropin (pST)
 Bovine Chymosin

Bacterial recombinants

Industrial applications
 Xylanases
 Proteases, which have found applications in both the industrial (such as the food industry) and domestic settings.

Viral recombinants

Medicinal applications
 Envelope protein of the hepatitis B virus marketed as Engerix-B by SmithKline Beecham
 HPV Vaccine proteins

Plant recombinants

Research applications
  Polyphenol oxidases (PPOs): These include both catechol oxidases and tyrosinases. In additional to research, PPOs have also found applications as biocatalysts.
 Cystatins are proteins that inhibit cysteine proteases. Research are ongoing to evaluate the potential of using cystatins in crop protection to control herbivorous pests and pathogens.

Industrial applications
 Laccases have found a wide range of application, from food additive and beverage processing to biomedical diagnosis, and as cross‐linking agents for furniture construction or in the production of biofuels.
 The tyrosinase‐induced polymerization of peptides offers facile access to artificial mussel foot protein analogues.  Next generation universal glues can be envisioned that perform effectively even under rigorous seawater conditions and adapt to a broad range of difficult surfaces.

See also 
 Protein production
 Gene expression
 Protein purification
 Host cell protein

References

External links 
 Laboratorios Beta S.A website
 CP Pharma/Wockhardt UK website

 
Biotechnology
Biotechnology products